Senator Folger may refer to:

Charles J. Folger (1818–1884), New York State Senate
John Hamlin Folger (1880–1963), North Carolina State Senate
Walter Folger Jr. (1765–1849), Massachusetts State Senate